Hocking is a surname. Notable people with the surname include:

 Amanda Hocking, American writer
 Anne Hocking, English crime writer
 Brian Hocking (1914–1974), Canadian entomologist
 Clint Hocking (born 1972), Canadian video game director and designer
 Garry Hocking, Australian rules football player for the Geelong Football Club
 Gary Hocking, Welsh motorcycle racer
 Heath Hocking, Australian rules football player for Essendon
 Jennifer Hocking (1929–2011), Australian-born British model and magazine editor
 Joseph Hocking, Cornish novelist and United Methodist Free Church minister
 Silas Hocking, Methodist minister, and Victorian novelist
 William Ernest Hocking, American Idealist philosopher

See also
 Hockings

Cornish-language surnames